Fayette Electric Cooperative, Inc. is a non-profit rural electric utility cooperative headquartered in La Grange, Texas.

The Cooperative was organized in 1937.

The Cooperative serves portions of seven counties in the state of Texas, in a territory generally surrounding La Grange.

External links
Fayette Electric Cooperative

Companies based in Texas
Electric cooperatives in Texas
Austin County, Texas
Bastrop County, Texas
Colorado County, Texas
Fayette County, Texas
Lavaca County, Texas
Lee County, Texas
Washington County, Texas